Henley by-election may refer to any of three by-elections in the UK parliamentary constituency of Henley:
 1917 Henley by-election
 1932 Henley by-election
 2008 Henley by-election